Mohamed Samy Abdullah (born 1964) is an Emirati sprinter. He competed in the men's 100 metres at the 1984 Summer Olympics.

References

External links
 

1964 births
Living people
Athletes (track and field) at the 1984 Summer Olympics
Emirati male sprinters
Olympic athletes of the United Arab Emirates
Place of birth missing (living people)